Rominigue Kouamé N'Guessan (born 17 December 1996) is a professional footballer who plays as midfielder for Ligue 1 club Troyes. Born in Ivory Coast, he represents Mali at international level.

Club career
Kouamé made his Ligue 1 debut on 6 August 2017 in a 3–0 home win against Nantes. He replaced Fodé Ballo-Touré at halftime. He was loaned to Cercle Brugge for the 2019–20 season.

Career statistics

Club

References

1996 births
Living people
People from Lagunes District
Association football midfielders
Citizens of Mali through descent
Malian footballers
Malian expatriate footballers
Mali international footballers
Malian people of Ivorian descent
Sportspeople of Ivorian descent
Ivorian footballers
Ivorian people of Malian descent
Sportspeople of Malian descent
2021 Africa Cup of Nations players
Ligue 1 players
Ligue 2 players
Championnat National 2 players
Championnat National 3 players
Belgian Pro League players
AS Real Bamako players
Paris FC players
Lille OSC players
Cercle Brugge K.S.V. players
ES Troyes AC players
Malian expatriate sportspeople in France
Malian expatriate sportspeople in Belgium
Expatriate footballers in France
Expatriate footballers in Belgium
Mali A' international footballers
2016 African Nations Championship players